W-League or W League may refer to:

 A-League Women, the top Australian women’s association football league, named the W-League from 2008 until 2021
 USL W-League, a former North American women’s soccer (association football) league
 USL W League, a current American women’s soccer (association football) league
 Capital Football W-League,  a New Zealand women's association football regional league
 Women's Japan Basketball League, the top Japanese women's basketball league

See also
 WE League
 WK League